The Dewoitine D.770 was a prototype French twin-engined attack aircraft of the late 1930s. It was intended as a replacement for the Breguet 693 but testing was incomplete by the time that France surrendered to Germany, and no production followed.

Design and development
In August 1937, the Service Technique de l'Aeronautique (or French Air Ministry) released a specification for a light attack bomber. The Société nationale des constructions aéronautiques du Midi (SNCAM), the nationalised Dewoitine company, proposed a three-seater twin-engined aircraft to meet this requirement, with two prototypes being ordered, with the Dewoitine D.770 to be powered by two Hispano-Suiza 12Y V12 engines and the Dewoitine D.771 to be powered by two Gnome-Rhône 14N radial engines but otherwise similar to the D.770. In the meantime, it was decided to adapt the Breguet 690 twin-engined fighter aircraft to an attack aircraft, with 200 Breguet 691 attack aircraft ordered in June 1938.

The prototype D.770 was completed at SNCAM's Toulouse factory in the spring of 1939. It was a mid-winged cantilever monoplane of stressed skin all-metal construction, with a monocoque fuselage and a retractable tailwheel undercarriage. A 20-mm cannon and two 7.5 mm machine guns were mounted in the aircraft's nose, and could be depressed to an angle of -15 degrees aimed by the pilot. A single machine gun was flexibly mounted in the dorsal position, with two more machine guns in a ventral position, while eight  bombs could be carried in a bomb-bay.

The D.770 made its maiden flight on 27 June 1939, flown by test pilot Marcel Doret. While the aircraft demonstrated good speed, it suffered from engine cooling problems and poor stability, and testing was slow, and was not complete in June 1940 when the French surrender resulting in the test programme being abandoned. Although the D.771 was completed in December 1939, it never flew, as the French Air Force by now preferred the larger and more capable Bloch 175 and SNCAM were busy with the more urgent Dewoitine D.520 fighter. Both prototypes were scrapped in 1941.

Specifications (D.770)

Notes

References

External links

Dewoitine D-770

1930s French bomber aircraft
D.770
Mid-wing aircraft
Aircraft first flown in 1939
Twin piston-engined tractor aircraft